Rosalie Mercille (born 30 March 2003) is a Canadian basketball player. She competed at the 2022 Commonwealth Games, in 3x3 basketball, winning a gold medal. 

She competed at the 2021 FIBA Under-19 Women's Basketball World Cup.

She plays for St-Jean-Sur-Richelieu, Quebec.

References 

2003 births
Living people
Canadian women's 3x3 basketball players
Basketball players at the 2022 Commonwealth Games
Medallists at the 2022 Commonwealth Games
Commonwealth Games gold medallists for Canada